Wychwood School is an independent school for girls aged 11–18, located in Oxford, Oxfordshire, England. The school is a member of the Girls' Schools Association and is a registered charity. The school is located on the southern corner of Bardwell Road and Banbury Road in North Oxford. The Dragon School is located close by, further down Bardwell Road.

History

The school was established in 1897 at 41 Banbury Road in North Oxford with one pupil under Miss Batty and Miss Lee. It moved to 77 Banbury Road with 7 pupils in 1898. The first boarders were accepted in 1912. The school moved to 74 Banbury Road in 1918. Miss Snodgrass became the Headmistress in 1941 and introduced the Dalton System of learning. The school became an educational trust in 1952. Weekly boarding started in 1985. A blue plaque was installed by the Society of Biology in 2015 on the wall outside the school on Banbury Road recording that the biologist Dame Honor Fell  DBE, FRS (1900–1986) studied at the school.

Alumnae
The following were or are alumnae of the school:

 Joan Aiken MBE (1924–2004), writer.
Margaret Casson (Lady Casson) (1913–1999), architect, designer, photographer, and wife of architect Sir Hugh Casson.
 Dame Honor Fell DBE, FRS (1900–1986), zoologist.
 Dame Henrietta Miriam Ottoline Leyser DBE FRS (born 1965), plant biologist
 Carola Oman CBE (1897–1978), historical novelist, biographer, and children's writer.
 Rozsika Parker (1945–2010), psychotherapist, art historian, writer, and feminist.
 Florence Pugh (born 1996), actress.
 Nancy Sandars FSA, FBA (1914–2015), archaeologist and prehistorian.

References

External links
 Wychwood School website

1897 establishments in England
Educational institutions established in 1897
Schools in Oxford
Private schools in Oxfordshire
Girls' schools in Oxfordshire
Boarding schools in Oxfordshire
Member schools of the Girls' Schools Association